Jean-Louis Schiltz (born 14 August 1964 in Luxembourg City) is a Luxembourgian lawyer and retired politician for the Christian Social People's Party (CSV).

Early life and education
Schiltz studied law in Luxembourg and Paris, and became a lawyer in 1989.

Career
Schiltz was first elected to the Chamber of Deputies in 2004 and subsequently served as minister in Jean-Claude Juncker's government, including as Minister for Cooperation and Humanitarian Affairs and Minister delegate for communications. On the 22 February 2006 he additionally became Minister for Defence. He stepped down from these positions with the formation of a new government on 23 July 2009, and became the leader of the CSV group in the newly elected Chamber of Deputies.

Other activities
 RTL Group, Non-Executive Member of the Board of Directors (since 2017)
 Quilvest, Member of the Board of Directors (since 2016)
 Skype, Non-Executive Member of the Board of Directors (2010–2011)
 FEDIL, Vice-chairman of the Board of Directors (since 2019)

References

}
|-

|-

|-

|-

Ministers for Communications of Luxembourg
Ministers for Defence of Luxembourg
Members of the Chamber of Deputies (Luxembourg)
Members of the Chamber of Deputies (Luxembourg) from Centre
Christian Social People's Party politicians
20th-century Luxembourgian lawyers
Alumni of the Athénée de Luxembourg
1964 births
Living people
People from Luxembourg City